Flight West Airlines was an Australian regional airline headquartered in Brisbane, Queensland. Established in May 1987, it operated predominantly in Queensland. The airline went into voluntary liquidation on 19 June 2001 before being sold to Queensland Aviation Holdings, the parent company of Alliance Airlines in April 2002.  The company slogan is Jetting into new territory.

History
Flight West Airlines was established by Sir Dennis Buchanan in 1987 to operate subsidised passenger services to remote communities on Queensland Government contracts.

Initially, the airline used Beechcraft Super King Air aircraft on these services from a base in Brisbane and then quickly expanded, adding DHC-6 Twin Otters and an EMB 110 to the fleet. A second base was established in Cairns. It was soon operating the most extensive network of routes throughout regional Queensland.

From bases in Brisbane, Townsville and Cairns it served major cities and small regional communities throughout the state including communities on Cape York Peninsula and in the Torres Strait, major coastal cities and islands, and cities and towns in western Queensland.

The airline was affiliated with (but independent of) Ansett Australia airlines which ceased operations on 14 September 2001.
Before entering liquidation in June 2001, Flight West serviced 34 destinations and employed over 420 staff.

Collapse
On 16 June 2001, the airline was placed into voluntary liquidation and PricewaterhouseCoopers was appointed to manage the company. Ansett announced on 27 June that they would lease eight of the company's aircraft and restart 16 routes effective immediately. On 13 September 2001, Ansett itself collapsed, again halting Flight West services. After extensive restructuring, the airline was offered for sale on 29 September 2001. In an effort to revitalise the airline, the Australian Government announced on 6 November that they would underwrite the airline's operating costs for three months. The airline began flights between Gladstone and Brisbane on 17 November 2001. After the airline failed to sell, it was placed into Voluntary Administration on 4 December 2001.

On 16 April 2002, it was announced that Queensland Aviation Holdings had purchased Flight West Airlines and intended to restructure the company under a new name, Alliance Airlines. Most of the assets of Flight West including the Fokker jets were purchased and the Embraer EMB 120s were sold. Alliance Airlines operated the Fokker 100s on selected charter routes from Brisbane, Townsville and Mount Isa for a period of time before suspending these regular services and operating ad hoc charter services.

Fleet

In the mid 1990s, the fleet was composed of Beechcraft King Airs, DHC-6 Twin Otters, de Havilland Canada Dash 8s, Embraer EMB 110s and EMB 120s. By the late 1990s the airline had disposed of the Twin Otters and EMB 110s. It acquired Jetstream J32s and jet aircraft in the form of three ex-Ansett Fokker F28s followed shortly after by two newer Fokker 100s.

At the suspension of services, Flight West operated a mixed fleet of 16 jet and turboprop aircraft:

Destinations
Flight West operated 34 routes at the time its services were suspended.

Over the airline's 14-year history, it travelled to destinations in Queensland, New South Wales, the Northern Territory and Norfolk Island including:
Bamaga, Barcaldine, Bedourie, Birdsville, Blackwater, Boulia, Brisbane, Bundaberg, Cairns, Charleville, Coen, Cooktown, Doomadgee, Edward River, Emerald, Gladstone, Hervey Bay, Hughenden, Julia Creek, Kurumba, Kowanyama, Lockhart River, Longreach, Mackay, Mornington Island, Mount Isa, Normanton, Norfolk Island, Proserpine, Quilpie, Richmond, Rockhampton, Roma, Sydney, Thursday Island (Horn Island), Townsville, Weipa, Windorah and Winton.

The Fokker jets were used on services linking Norfolk Island with Brisbane and Sydney and between Brisbane, Townsville, Gladstone, Longreach and Emerald.

In Brisbane, the airline operated from the Ansett Domestic terminal. In Cairns, the airline operated from its own terminal on the western side of the airport adjacent to the Captain Cook Highway for a short time before transferring its operations to the Ansett Terminal in the main terminal complex on the eastern side of the airport.

The Flight West base in Cairns was later sold to Transtate airlines.

See also
List of defunct airlines of Australia

References

External links

Flight West Photos

 Norfolk Island, Airways Magazine, May 2000 pp41–42. (ISSN 1074-4320)

Defunct airlines of Australia
Airlines established in 1987
Airlines disestablished in 2001
Ansett Australia
Companies based in Brisbane